Miss Universe Canada 2009 was a beauty pageant contest held at The Metro Toronto Convention Centre's John Bassett Theatre in Toronto, the pageant presented by Dominique Dufour, miss Canada 1981, Miss Universe 1981 1st runner-up and miss universe Canada organization representative and co-host Rick Campanelli. 
Mariana Valente, a 23-year-old of Richmond Hill, Ontario, was crowned Miss Universe Canada 2009. She was amongst 63 other contestants who competed for the title.

Valente represented Canada in the Miss Universe 2009 competition held on August 23, 2008 in Nassau, Bahamas where she did not place as a semifinalist.

Results

Special awards

 Miss Elegance - Chanel Beckenlehner (Ontario Province) 
 Miss Congeniality - Jessica Goncalvez (Southeast Ontario)
 Miss Photogenic - Tara Mobayen (East Toronto)
 Talent Award - Kaley Johnson (Calgary Alberta)

Order of Announcement

Top 5 
 North Toronto
 Upper Canada
 Victoria
 Richmond Hill
 South Toronto

Top 12 
 Calgary
 Southeast Ontario
 North Toronto
 Calgary
 Richmond Hill
 South Toronto
 Southwest Canada
 Victoria
 East Ontario
 Quebec Province
 Upper Canada
 Ontario Province

Top 20 
 Quebec Province
 Newfoundland & Labrador Province
 Richmond Hill
 East Toronto
 Ontario Province
 Southeast Ontario
 East Ontario
 Alberta Province
 Calgary
 Manitoba Province
 Scarborough
 Montreal
 South Toronto
 Southwest Canada
 Burrard Peninsula
 Upper Canada
 Victoria
 British Columbia Province
 North Toronto
 Lower Quebec

Contestants  
There was 63 total contestants

References

External links

2009 beauty pageants
2009 in Canada
Miss Universe Canada
Events in Toronto